This is a list of copyright acts, which are laws enacting the copyright.

Afghanistan 

The law on the support the right of authors, composers, artists and researchers (Copy Right Law) enacted in 2008.

Argentina 

 Article 17º Constitution of Argentina, 1853
 National Law 9.141, 1913
 National Law 11.723, 1933

Australia 

 Australian Copyright Act 1968

Austria 

 Urheberrechtsgesetz (Austria), the Copyright Act of Austria

Azerbaijan

 Law on Copyright and Related Rights (Azerbaijan)

Canada 

 Copyright Act of Canada

Chile

People's Republic of China 

 Copyright Law of the PRC

Croatia
 Copyright and Related Rights Act (2003)

Czech Republic 
 Copyright Act (Czech Republic).

Egypt 
Copyright law of Egypt

El Salvador
Copyright law of El Salvador

European Union 

 Computer Programs Directive (1991)
 Conditional Access Directive (1998)
 Counterfeit goods regulation (2003)
 Copyright in the Digital Single Market (2019)
 Copyright Duration Directive (1993)
 Copyright Term Directive (2006)
 Database Directive (1996)
 Enforcement Directive (2004)
 Electronic Commerce Directive 2000 (2000)
 Information Society Directive (2001)
 Resale Rights Directive (2001)
 Re-use of public sector information directive (2003)
 Rental Directive (1992)
 Satellite and Cable Directive (1993)

Finland 

 Copyright Act (Finland)
 Lex Karpela, the 2005 amendment to the Finnish Copyright Act and Criminal Code

France 

 Code de la propriété intellectuelle, Intellectual Property Code
 DADVSI, law on authors' rights and related rights in the information society
 HADOPI law, law promoting the distribution and protection of creative works on the internet

Germany 
 Urheberrechtsgesetz, the Copyright Act of Germany

Greece 
Copyright law of Greece

Hong Kong 

Copyright Act 1956 (UK legislation, applies to works made before 27 July 1997)
Copyright Ordinance 1997 (applies to works made after 27 July 1997)

India
The Copyright Act, 1957

Iran 

 Copyright Act (Iran)

Ireland 

 Copyright and Related Rights Act

Japan 

 Copyright Act (Japan)

Jordan

 Copyright Act (Jordan)

Malaysia 
Copyright law of Malaysia

Nepal 

 The Copyright Act, 2022 (1965)
 The Copyright Act, 2059 (2002), current copyright law of Nepal
 Some Nepal Acts relating to Export and Import and Intellectual Property Act, 2063 (2006)

Netherlands 

 Auteurswet

New Zealand

 Copyright Act 1994

Pakistan

 Copyright legislation in Pakistan

Philippines
 Intellectual Property Code of the Philippines

Poland

 Copyright Act (Poland)

Russia

 Part IV of the Civil Code of Russia

Slovakia 
 Copyright Act (Slovakia)

Singapore 
 Copyright Act (Singapore) 2014

Serbia
The Law on Copyright and Related Rights (Serbia)

South Africa 
 Copyright Act, 1978
 Copyright Amendment Act, 1983
 Copyright Amendment Act, 1984
 Copyright Amendment Act, 1986
 Copyright Amendment Act, 1988
 Copyright Amendment Act, 1989
 Copyright Amendment Act, 1992
 Intellectual Property Laws Amendment Act, 1997
 Copyright Amendment Act, 2002

Spain

 Ley de Propriedad Intelectual

Suriname
Law of 22 March 1913 laying down new rules on Copyright (G.B. 1913 No. 15), as it stands after the amendments thereto in G.B. 1915 No. 78, G.B. 1946 No. 2, G.B. 1946 No. 77, G.B. 1959 No. 76, S.B. 1980 No. 116, S.B. 23, 1981.

Switzerland

 Urheberrechtsgesetz (Switzerland), the Copyright Act of Switzerland

Tajikistan

 Law on Copyright and Related rights of Republic of Tajikistan

Thailand
Copyright law of Thailand

Turkey

 Law on Intellectual and Artistic Works

United Kingdom

 Statute of Anne or Copyright Act 1710, the first copyright Act of the United Kingdom
The Copyright Acts 1734 to 1888 is the collective title of the following Acts:
The Engraving Copyright Act 1734 (8 Geo 2 c 13)
The Engraving Copyright Act 1766 (7 Geo 3 c 38)
The Copyright Act 1775 (15 Geo 3 c 53)
The Prints Copyright Act 1777 (17 Geo 3 c 57)
The Sculpture Copyright Act 1814 (54 Geo 3 c 56)
The Dramatic Copyright Act 1833 (3 & 4 Will 4 c 15)
The Lectures Copyright Act 1835 (5 & 6 Will 4 c 65)
The Prints and Engravings Copyright (Ireland) Act 1836 (6 & 7 Will 4 c 59)
The Copyright Act 1836 (6 & 7 Will 4 c 110)
The Copyright Act 1842 (5 & 6 Vict c 45)
The Colonial Copyright Act 1847 (10 & 11 Vict c 95)
The Fine Arts Copyright Act 1862 (25 & 26 Vict c 68)
The Copyright (Musical Compositions) Act 1882 (45 & 46 Vict c 40)
The Copyright (Musical Compositions) Act 1888  (51 & 52 Vict c 17)
 Copyright Act 1911
 Copyright Act 1956 (4 & 5 Eliz 2 c 52)
 Copyright, Designs and Patents Act 1988, current copyright law of the United Kingdom

United States 

 Copyright Act of 1790
 International Copyright Act of 1891
 Copyright Act of 1909
 Copyright Act of 1976
 Digital Millennium Copyright Act

See also
Copyright law
List of copyright case law
List of countries' copyright length
List of countries' copyright length based on publication and creation dates

References

Copyright acts
Copyright acts